Stone Cold Sober may refer to

 Stone Cold Sober (album), a studio album from the German thrash metal band Tankard, or a song from that album
 "Stone Cold Sober" (Paloma Faith song), a song performed by Paloma Faith.
 "Stone Cold Sober" (Brantley Gilbert song), a song performed by Brantley Gilbert.
 "Stone Cold Sober", a song by Rod Stewart, from his 1975 album Atlantic Crossing
 "Stone Cold Sober", a song by Del Amitri, from their 1989 album Waking Hours
 "Stone Cold Sober", a song by Crawler, from their 1977 album Crawler